Grochowiak is a Polish surname. Notable people with the surname include:

 Sebastian Grochowiak (born 1977), Polish vocalist, member of metal band Witchmaster
 Stanisław Grochowiak (1934–1976), Polish poet and dramatist

Polish-language surnames